Galicea is a commune located in Vâlcea County, Muntenia, Romania. It is composed of nine villages: Bratia din Deal, Bratia din Vale, Cocoru, Cremenari, Dealu Mare, Galicea, Ostroveni, Teiu and Valea Râului.

References

Communes in Vâlcea County
Localities in Muntenia